Forcett is a mainly rural locality, with an urban area on the outskirts of neighbouring Lewisham. It is in the local government area of Sorell in the South-east region of Tasmania. The 2016 census has a population of 964 for the state suburb of Forcett.

History
Forcett was gazetted as a locality in 1972. An early settler, James Gordon, was born at Forcett, Yorkshire in 1779.

Geography
Most of the boundaries of the locality are survey lines. The shore of Pitt Water Estuary forms part of the western boundary.

Road infrastructure
The A9 route (Arthur Highway) enters from the north-west and runs through to the east, where it exits. Route C333 (Delmore Road) starts at an intersection with A9 and runs north until it exits. Route C334 (Old Forcett Road) starts at an intersection with A9 and runs south until it exits. Route C340 (Lewisham Scenic Deive) starts at an intersection with A9 and runs south until it exits. Route C349 (Sugarloaf Road) starts at an intersection with A9 and runs south until it exits.

References

Towns in Tasmania
Localities of Sorell Council